Books on Tape is a one-man electronic and rock act from Los Angeles, California. With Matt Dennebaum, he formed the duo Subverse, whose sole, self-released cassette Nobody Likes You (1998). The band split shortly afterwards as their members moved to opposite coasts: Matt went to New York City, and Todd to Los Angeles.

Drootin started Books on Tape in 1999, dubbing its punk rock-influenced electronica "beatpunk", and released home recordings and demos for the first few years of the project's existence. The full-length Throw Down Your Laptops, issued on the label Deathbomb Arc in 2002, was the first release of Drootin's to have substantial distribution, and it was the first of a series of albums that followed in quick succession. These include Books on Tape Sings the Blues, released on Greyday Productions in 2003; The Business End, an EP issued in 2004, also on Greyday; and Dinosaur Dinosaur, which appeared on Alien8 Recordings in 2005. After the 2006 compilation Who Shot Ya?, Books on Tape went on hiatus until 2011, when the Still Ride EP followed; another full-length, Retired Numbers, arrived in 2012.

Albums

Throw Down Your Laptops
Sad Song (Winter Version)
Smart on TV 	
The Crawl
Sporty But Sensible Car
Dance of the Drum Cadets
Terranaut
The Contenders (w/ Rose for Bohdan)
Hey Typical
Offend Your Fan Base
Dime a Dozen
Deathbomb Mafia
Wake Up Call
Replica, California

Books on Tape Sings The Blues
Laptop Blues
Republic Of
See You In Tokyo
She's Dead to Me
Pointe du Pied
Girls Up Front
Death in the Sex Shop
Siberian Soundsystem
Circus Animal Battle Rap (Instrumental)
Frisson
Bicycle Beat
Shake That
The Crucial
Unlucky Bounce
Sidekick 
Church Bus

The Business End
The Truth, The Whole Truth, & An Assortment of Lies
Grey Matters
Patron Saints III 
Ill Team Captain
People That Don't Like Me / People That I Don't Like
Stones to Turn, Bridges to Burn
Bullets
I Will Straight Get You Arrested
What Satan Said to Me

Dinosaur Dinosaur
Noise is Political
Killing Machine
Surly Ambassador
Bubblegum
Upon Rock City
When Siblings Attack
Fat Face 
We Call You Nasty
Tom Delay 
Seeing Things Again
If You Don't Live Here, Don't Surf Here
Kingston
Hands Off My Issues
Kitten Kitten Kitten Kitten Kitten Surprise

Who Shot Ya? (Remixes + Rarities)
Bubblegum (Hubba Bubba mx by numn)
Bubbledub (Poingly remix)
Bubbagumbaby (Doofgoblin remix)           
Bubblegum (Brian Miller's Future Tense)
Bossy Cow (Golden Arches Mix by v.v.)
Bossy Cow (Teaser Mix by Octopus Inc)
Bossy Cow (Skinny Leather Tie Mix)  
Demons Got Me (2006)          
Fight Songs, Windmills, Toll Roads (2005)     
Slinky Slur (2005)          
Dreidel, Dreidel, Dreidel (2005)                              
Don't Mess With Texas (2000)          
Phonographic Memory (2000)       
Untitled   (unknown)
Flagburning (Aa – Books on Tape remix)  (2005)
Firebombing (Bipolar Bear – Books on Tape remix) (2005)
Tall Cotton (2005)
Fireshrub (2005 live rehearsal)

References

Musical groups from Los Angeles
Alien8 Recordings artists